The Max Planck Institute for Research on Collective Goods (German: Max-Planck-Institut zur Erforschung von Gemeinschaftsgütern) is located in Bonn, Germany. It is one of 80 institutes in the Max Planck Society. The institute focuses its study on law, economics and politics of collective goods.

History
The institute was founded  1997 as temporary project called "Common Goods: Law, Politics and Economics" and transformed into a permanent institute in 2003.

Management
As of 2010, its two directors are economist Martin Hellwig and law scholar Christoph Engel. Meanwhile, the following represent the institute's current academic advisory board.

Academic Advisory Board
 Prof. Philippe Aghion
 Prof. Dr. Susanne Baer, LL.M.
 Prof. Patrick Bolton
 Prof. Dr. Christian Gollier
 Prof. Dr. Oliver Lepsius, LL.M.
 Prof. Jeffrey J. Rachlinski
 Prof. Dr. Christine Windbichler, LL.M.
 Prof. Dr. Frans A. A. M. van Winden
Prof. Kathryn Zeiler

Research groups 

 Behavioral Law and Economics (Christoph Engel)
Experimental Economics (Matthias Sutter)
"Moral Courage" (Anna Baumert)
Economic Cognition (Susann Fiedler)
Mechanisms of Normative Change (Fabian Winter)

References

External links
 Official site MPI

Research on Collective Goods
Economic research institutes
University of Bonn